Brent Joanne Peñaflor (born March 8, 2004) commonly known as Brenna and Brenna Garcia is a Filipino actress, dancer and commercial model. Her career started at Star Circle Quest 2011 where she won as the Grand Girl Kiddie Superstar. She's a regular cast of ABS-CBN's Sunday kiddie gag show, Goin' Bulilit. She's known for her role as the young Galema on Galema: Anak ni Zuma.

Filmography

Television

Film

Awards and nominations
She won the title "Female Grand Kiddie Questor" on ABS-CBN's talent search Star Circle Quest in 2011.

She was nominated for the category Best Single Performance by an Actress at the 26th PMPC Star Awards for Television for her role on Maalaala Mo Kaya episode "Cards". Other nominees include Iza Calzado, Gina Pareño, Angel Aquino and Maricel Soriano. Sylvia Sanchez won the award.

References

External links

2004 births
Living people
Star Magic
Filipino child actresses
Filipino female models
Filipino female dancers
Place of birth missing (living people)
Star Circle Quest participants
Star Circle Quest winners